George Hawkes may refer to:
 George P. Hawkes (1824–1903), United States Army officer during the Civil War
 George Wright Hawkes (1821–1908), Australian Anglican philanthropist 
 George W. Hawkes (died 2004), publisher of the Arlington Citizen-Journal; see List of newspapers in Texas
 George Hawkes, the 1900 Australian shot put champion; see List of Australian athletics champions (men)